Koninklijke Sportvereniging Waregem was a Belgian football club that existed between 1925 and 2001.  It played three spells at the highest level in the Belgian football league system each separated by a single season at the second level:  from 1966 to 1972, from 1973 to 1994 and in 1995–96. Their best ranking was reached in 1968, 1985 and 1993 when they finished fourth.

History
Waereghem Sportif (in French) was founded in 1925 in Waregem, West Flanders, then changed its name to Waregem Sportief (its Dutch translation) in 1945.  One year later, the club merged with Red Star Waregem to become S.V. Waregem.  The new team became a member of the national association on the same year and was assigned the matricule number 4451.  In 1951 the club received the right to be called royal (Dutch: Koninklijk) which was at the time given to any team founded 25 years before.

K.S.V. Waregem became the first team from Waregem to play in the second division in 1963.  In 1966 it accessed to the first division and remained at that level for a while (except in 1972–73 and in 1994–95).  It even won the 1974 Cup and the 1982 Supercup. In 1985–86 UEFA Cup, it reached the semifinals, where 1. FC Köln stopped them.
In 1996, Waregem was finally relegated to second division where they stayed until 1999 (to fall into third division).  In 2001, due to financial problems, the club had to merge with Zultse V.V. and to keep their matricule (n°5381).  The new club was named S.V. Zulte Waregem and it plays the stadium that K.S.V. Waregem used to play in.

Former managers
1946–1948 Jean Bruneau
1948–1949 Willy Steyskal
1949–1950 Alfons De Winter
1950–1951 Robert Goethals
1951–1954 Marcel Vercammen
1954–1957 Freddy Chaves
1957–1960 Jeroom Burssens
1960–1961 John Van Alphen
1961–1966 Marcel De Corte
1966–1972 Freddy Chaves
1969–1970 André Van Maldeghem (intérim)
1972–1974 Hans Croon
1974–1975 Rik Matthijs
1975–1979 André Van Maldeghem
1978–1979 Julien Van Bever
1979–1981 Hans Croon
1981–1983 Sándor Popovics
1983–1990 Urbain Haesaert
1989–1990 Urbain Haesaert, Marc Millecamps, René Verheyen
1990–1991 René Verheyen
1991–1992 René Verheyen, Paul Theunis
1992–1993 Paul Theunis
1993–1994 Paul Theunis, Gerrit Laverge, Henk Houwaart
1994–1995 Aimé Anthuenis
1995–1996 Aimé Anthuenis, André Van Maldeghem
1996–1997 Marc Millecamps, André Van Maldeghem, Jerko Tipurić
1997–1998 Jerko Tipurić, Gerrit Laverge, Dennis De Tandt
1998–1999 Gilbert De Groote, Leo Vander Elst
1999–2000 Marc Millecamps
2000–2001 Stanley Bollen, Daniel Declerck, Prudent Bettens

References

 Pluto website – Belgian football clubs history
 RSSSF archive – 1st and 2nd division final tables

Association football clubs established in 1925
Defunct football clubs in Belgium
Association football clubs disestablished in 2001
1925 establishments in Belgium
2001 disestablishments in Belgium
Belgian Pro League clubs